The planalto tyrannulet (Phyllomyias fasciatus) is a species of bird in the family Tyrannidae. It is widespread in wooded habitats of eastern Brazil, extreme north-eastern Bolivia, eastern Paraguay, and far north-eastern Argentina. It is generally common (typically the commonest Phyllomyias in its range), and consequently rated as least concern by BirdLife International and IUCN. There are three relatively distinctive subspecies, differing in measurements, plumage and voice, and it is possible they are better regarded as separate species. It can be separated from other members of its genus found in its range by the combination of a greyish-tinged forecrown and an all-black bill.

References

planalto tyrannulet
Birds of Brazil
planalto tyrannulet
Taxonomy articles created by Polbot